The 35th New York State Legislature, consisting of the New York State Senate and the New York State Assembly, met from January 28 to June 19, 1812, during the fifth year of Daniel D. Tompkins's governorship, in Albany.

Background
Under the provisions of the New York Constitution of 1777, amended by the Constitutional Convention of 1801, 32 Senators were elected on general tickets in the four senatorial districts for four-year terms. They were divided into four classes, and every year eight Senate seats came up for election. Assemblymen were elected countywide on general tickets to a one-year term, the whole Assembly being renewed annually.

In 1797, Albany was declared the State capital, and all subsequent Legislatures have been meeting there ever since. In 1799, the Legislature enacted that future Legislatures meet on the last Tuesday of January of each year unless called earlier by the governor.

In 1808, Cattaraugus and Chautauqua counties had been split from Genesee County, but no county governments were organized for some time. In 1811, both counties were joined with Niagara in one Assembly district with 1 seat.

Lt. Gov. John Broome died on August 8, 1810, and a special election was required to fill the vacancy. State Senator and Mayor of New York City DeWitt Clinton was nominated by the Democratic-Republican majority. Nicholas Fish was nominated by the Federalists, and Marinus Willet was nominated by the Tammany organization in New York City which, although being the local affiliate of the Democratic-Republican Party, was opposed to Clinton.

At this time the politicians were divided into two opposing political parties: the Federalists and the Democratic-Republicans.

Elections
The State election was held from April 30 to May 2, 1811. DeWitt Clinton was elected Lieutenant Governor of New York.

Senator John Tayler (Eastern D.) was re-elected. Erastus Root, William Taber (both Middle D.), Elisha Arnold, Kitchel Bishop, Ruggles Hubbard (all three Eastern D.), Casper M. Rouse (Western D.), and Assemblyman Nathan Sanford (Southern D.) were also elected to the Senate. All eight were Democratic-Republicans.

Sessions
The Legislature met at the Old State Capitol in Albany on January 28, 1812; was prorogued by the Governor on March 27; met again on May 21; and adjourned on June 19.

Alexander Sheldon (Dem.-Rep.) was again elected Speaker, without opposition.

On February 5, the Assembly passed a bill (vote 50 to 42) to re-appoint David Thomas (Dem.-Rep.) as New York State Treasurer in place of Abraham G. Lansing (Fed.). The Senate concurred on February 8 by a vote of 19 to 5.

The main political controversy during this session was the chartering of the Bank of America with a capital of $6,000,000. The bankers offered to pay a bonus of $600,000, to be divided as follows: $400,000 to the Common-School Fund, $100,000 to the Literature Fund and $100,00 to the State Treasury if during the next 20 years no other bank would be chartered. Besides, the bankers offered a loan of $1,000,000 to the State at 5% interest p.a. to be used for the Erie Canal construction; and a loan of $1,000,000 at 6% interest to the farmers who were losing money because of the Embargo. State Treasurer David Thomas and Solomon Southwick were the main lobbyists for the chartering; Gov. Daniel D. Tompkins, Supreme Court Justice Ambrose Spencer and State Senator John Tayler "declared open war against the bank." Lt. Gov. DeWitt Clinton told his brother-in-law, and close political ally of many years, Ambrose Spencer that he would, if necessary, vote against the charter (as Lt. Gov. he had only a casting vote in the Senate), but that he would not make the issue a question of party discipline, leaving it to the Democratic-Republican legislators to vote as they thought fit. This led to Spencer's joining the Anti-Clintonians shortly thereafter. The Assembly passed the bill to charter the bank in second reading with a vote of 52 to 46. The bill then went to the Senate, and a motion was made to reject it, but was voted down 15 to 13. To avoid the bill going through, on March 27, Gov. Tompkins prorogued the Legislature until May 21, saying that proof had been furnished that the bankers had bribed legislators to vote for the charter. After the Legislature met again, the bank charter was passed in the Senate by a vote of 17 to 13, and in third reading in the Assembly by a vote of 58 to 39. In 1813, the bank asked the Legislature to cancel the payment of the bonus, which had been a condition sine qua non of the charter, and only $100,000 were actually paid into the Common School Fund.

On May 28, a caucus of Dem.-Rep. legislators, presided over by James W. Wilkin, nominated DeWitt Clinton for U.S. president. On June 18, the United States declared War against Great Britain, and the Legislature adjourned on the next day.

State Senate

Districts
 The Southern District (5 seats) consisted of Kings, New York, Queens, Richmond, Suffolk and Westchester counties.
 The Middle District (7 seats) consisted of Dutchess, Orange, Ulster, Columbia, Delaware, Rockland, Greene and Sullivan counties.
 The Eastern District (8 seats) consisted of Washington, Clinton, Rensselaer, Albany, Saratoga, Essex, Montgomery, Franklin and Schenectady counties.
 The Western District (12 seats) consisted of Herkimer, Ontario, Otsego, Tioga, Onondaga, Schoharie, Steuben, Chenango, Oneida, Cayuga, Genesee, Seneca, Jefferson, Lewis, St. Lawrence, Allegany, Broome, Madison, Niagara, Cortland, Cattaraugus and Chautauqua counties.

Note: There are now 62 counties in the State of New York. The counties which are not mentioned in this list had not yet been established, or sufficiently organized, the area being included in one or more of the abovementioned counties.

Members
The asterisk (*) denotes members of the previous Legislature who continued in office as members of this Legislature. Nathan Sanford changed from the Assembly to the Senate.

Employees
 Clerk: Sebastian Visscher

State Assembly

Districts

 Albany County (4 seats)
 Allegany and Steuben counties (1 seat)
 Broome County (1 seat)
 Cattaraugus, Chautauqua and Niagara counties (1 seat)
 Cayuga County (3 seats)
 Chenango County (3 seats)
 Clinton and Franklin counties (1 seat)
 Columbia County (4 seats)
 Cortland County (1 seat)
 Delaware County (2 seats)
 Dutchess County (6 seats)
 Essex County (1 seat)
 Genesee County (1 seat)
 Greene County (2 seats)
 Herkimer County (3 seats)
 Jefferson County (2 seats)
 Kings County (1 seat)
 Lewis County (1 seat)
 Madison County (3 seats)
 Montgomery County (5 seats)
 The City and County of New York (11 seats)
 Oneida County (5 seats)
 Onondaga County (2 seats)
 Ontario County (5 seats)
 Orange County (4 seats)
 Otsego County (4 seats)
 Queens County (3 seats)
 Rensselaer County (4 seats)
 Richmond County (1 seat)
 Rockland County (1 seat)
 St. Lawrence County (1 seat)
 Saratoga County (4 seats)
 Schenectady County (2 seats)
 Schoharie County (2 seats)
 Seneca County (1 seat)
 Suffolk County (3 seats)
 Sullivan and Ulster counties (4 seats)
 Tioga County (1 seat)
 Washington County (5 seats)
 Westchester County (3 seats)

Note: There are now 62 counties in the State of New York. The counties which are not mentioned in this list had not yet been established, or sufficiently organized, the area being included in one or more of the abovementioned counties.

Assemblymen
The asterisk (*) denotes members of the previous Legislature who continued as members of this Legislature.

Employees
 Clerk: Samuel North
 Sergeant-at-Arms: Thomas Donnelly
 Doorkeeper: Benjamin Whipple

Notes

Sources
 The New York Civil List compiled by Franklin Benjamin Hough (Weed, Parsons and Co., 1858) [see pg. 108f for Senate districts; pg. 121 for senators; pg. 148f for Assembly districts; pg. 185f for assemblymen]
 The History of Political Parties in the State of New-York, from the Ratification of the Federal Constitution to 1840 by Jabez D. Hammond (4th ed., Vol. 1, H. & E. Phinney, Cooperstown, 1846; pages 291-316)
 Election result Assembly, Albany Co. at project "A New Nation Votes", compiled by Phil Lampi, hosted by Tufts University Digital Library
 Election result Assembly, Broome Co. at project "A New Nation Votes"
 Election result Assembly, Clinton and Franklin Co. at project "A New Nation Votes"
 Election result Assembly, Cortland Co. at project "A New Nation Votes"
 Election result Assembly, Delaware Co. at project "A New Nation Votes"
 Election result Assembly, Essex Co. at project "A New Nation Votes"
 Election result Assembly, Greene Co. at project "A New Nation Votes"
 Election result Assembly, Jefferson Co. at project "A New Nation Votes"
 Election result Assembly, Kings Co. at project "A New Nation Votes"
 Election result Assembly, Madison Co. at project "A New Nation Votes"
 Election result Assembly, Onondaga Co. at project "A New Nation Votes"
 Election result Assembly, Onondaga Co. at project "A New Nation Votes"
 Election result Assembly, Queens Co. at project "A New Nation Votes"
 Election result Assembly, Richmond Co. at project "A New Nation Votes"
 Election result Assembly, Schenectady Co. at project "A New Nation Votes"
 Election result Assembly, Schoharie Co. at project "A New Nation Votes"
 Election result Assembly, Suffolk Co. at project "A New Nation Votes"
 Election result Assembly, Westchester Co. at project "A New Nation Votes"
 Election result Senate, Southern D. at project "A New Nation Votes"
 Election result Senate, Middle D. at project "A New Nation Votes"
 Election result Senate, Eastern D. at project "A New Nation Votes"
 Election result Senate, Western D. at project "A New Nation Votes"
 Election result, Council of Appointment at project "A New Nation Votes"

035
1811 in New York (state)
1812 in New York (state)
1811 U.S. legislative sessions